Abraham Ziv (–) was an Israeli mathematician, known for his contributions to the Zero-sum problem as one of the discoverers of the Erdős–Ginzburg–Ziv theorem.

Biography
Abraham Zubkowski (later Ziv) was born in Avihayil to Haim and Zila Zubkovski. In the 1950s, he changed his surname in the 1950s as part of the widespread Hebraization of surnames trend. He studied at the Technion – Israel Institute of Technology, where he earned his Ph.D. in mathematics, after receiving his master's degree from Harvard University.

Academic career
In 1961, at the age of 21, Ziv proved along with Paul Erdős and Abraham Ginzburg the general result that every sequence of  elements of   contains  terms that sum to zero.

In 1972 Ziv was part of the founding team of IBM R&D Labs in Israel, where he stayed until retirement. In his time at IBM he wrote 21 more publications and 6 patents.

Academic papers

References

External links
 
 PlanetMath Erdős, Ginzburg, Ziv Theorem

20th-century Israeli mathematicians
Israeli Jews
Harvard Graduate School of Arts and Sciences alumni
1940 births
2013 deaths
Technion – Israel Institute of Technology alumni